Visa requirements for Slovenian citizens are administrative entry restrictions imposed on citizens of Slovenia by the authorities of other states. As of 13 April 2021, Slovenian citizens had visa-free or visa on arrival access to 182 countries and territories, ranking the Slovenian passport 11th overall in terms of travel freedom (tied with the Latvian, Estonian, and Icelandic passports), and the highest ranking of the former Yugoslavian states, according to the Henley Passport Index.

Visa requirements map

Visa requirements

Territories and disputed areas
Visa requirements for Slovenian citizens for visits to various territories, disputed areas and restricted zones:

Europe
 — Visa required.
 — Visa required (issued for single entry for 21 days/1/2/3 months or multiple entry visa for 1/2/3 months).Travellers with Artsakh visa (expired or valid) or evidence of travel to Artsakh (stamps) will be permanently denied entry to Azerbaijan.
 Mount Athos — Special permit required (4 days: 25 euro for Orthodox visitors, 35 euro for non-Orthodox visitors, 18 euro for students). There is a visitors' quota: maximum 100 Orthodox and 10 non-Orthodox per day and women are not allowed.
 Brest and Grodno — Visa not required for 10 days.
 Crimea — Visa issued by Russia is required.
 — Visa free access for 3 months. Passport required.
 UN Buffer Zone in Cyprus — Access Permit is required for travelling inside the zone, except Civil Use Areas.
 — Visa not required.
 Jan Mayen — permit issued by the local police required for staying for less than 24 hours and permit issued by the Norwegian police for staying for more than 24 hours.
 — visa free for 90 days.
 — Visa free. Multiple entry visa to Russia and three-day prior notification are required to enter South Ossetia.
 — Visa free. Registration required after 24h.

Africa
 — special permit required.
  (outside Asmara) — visa covers Asmara only; to travel in the rest of the country, a Travel Permit for Foreigners is required (20 Eritrean nakfa).

 — eVisa for 3 months within any year period.
 — Visitor's Pass granted on arrival valid for 4/10/21/60/90 days for 12/14/16/20/25 pound sterling.
 — Permission to land required for 15/30 pounds sterling (yacht/ship passenger) for Tristan da Cunha Island or 20 pounds sterling for Gough Island, Inaccessible Island or Nightingale Islands.
 (Western Sahara controlled territory) — undefined visa regime.
 — visa required (30 days for 30 US dollars, payable on arrival).

Asia
 — Visa not required for 90 days.
 — Protected Area Permit (PAP) required for all of Arunachal Pradesh, Manipur, Mizoram and parts of Himachal Pradesh, Jammu and Kashmir and Uttarakhand. Restricted Area Permit (RAP) required for all of Andaman and Nicobar Islands and Lakshadweep and parts of Sikkim. Some of these requirements are occasionally lifted for a year.
 — Visa not required for 90 days.
 outside Pyongyang – People are not allowed to leave the capital city, tourists can only leave the capital with a governmental tourist guide (no independent moving)
 — Visa not required. Arrival by sea to Gaza Strip not allowed.
 — Visa not required for 90 days.
 Gorno-Badakhshan Autonomous Province — OIVR permit required (15+5 Tajikistani Somoni) and another special permit (free of charge) is required for Lake Sarez.
 Tibet Autonomous Region — Tibet Travel Permit required (10 US Dollars).
 Korean Demilitarized Zone — restricted zone.
 UNDOF Zone and Ghajar — restricted zones.

Caribbean and North Atlantic
 — Visa not required for 3 months.
 — Visa not required for 30 days.
 — Visa not required.
 Bonaire, St. Eustatius and Saba — Visa not required for 3 months.
 — Visa not required.
 — Visa not required for 6 months.
 — Visa not required for 3 months.
 — Visa not required for 6 months.
 — Visa not required under the Visa Waiver Program, for 90 days on arrival from overseas for 2 years. ESTA required.
 — Visa not required for 3 months.
 — Visa not required for 90 days.
 — Visa not required under the Visa Waiver Program, for 90 days on arrival from overseas for 2 years. ESTA required.

Oceania
 — Electronic authorization for 30 days.
 Ashmore and Cartier Islands — special authorisation required.
 Clipperton Island — special permit required.
 — Visa free access for 31 days.
 — Visa not required under the Visa Waiver Program, for 90 days on arrival from overseas for 2 years. ESTA required.
 — Visa on arrival valid for 30 days is issued free of charge.
 — 14 days visa free and landing fee US$35 or tax of US$5 if not going ashore.
 — Entry permit required.
 United States Minor Outlying Islands — special permits required for Baker Island, Howland Island, Jarvis Island, Johnston Atoll, Kingman Reef, Midway Atoll, Palmyra Atoll and Wake Island.

South Atlantic and Antarctica
 — Visitor Permit valid for 4 weeks is issued on arrival.
 — Pre-arrival permit from the Commissioner required (72 hours/1 month for 110/160 pounds sterling).

Non-ordinary passports
Holders of various categories of official Slovenian passports have additional visa-free access to the following countries - Azerbaijan (diplomatic passports), Cuba (diplomatic or service passports), Egypt (diplomatic, official, service or special passports), Indonesia (diplomatic or service passports), Kazakhstan (diplomatic passports), Libya (diplomatic, official or service passports), Russia (diplomatic passports) and Vietnam (diplomatic or service passports). Holders of diplomatic or service passports of any country have visa-free access to Cape Verde, Ethiopia, Mali and Zimbabwe.

Non-visa restrictions

Right to consular protection in non-EU countries

When in a non-EU country where there is no Slovenian embassy, Slovenian citizens as EU citizens have the right to get consular protection from the embassy of any other EU country present in that country.

See also List of diplomatic missions of Slovenia.

See also

 Visa requirements for European Union citizens
 Slovenian passport
 Visa policy of the Schengen Area

References and Notes
References

Notes

Slovenia
Foreign relations of Slovenia